Armed and Hammered is a hardcore punk band from Toronto, Ontario, spawned from Bunchofuckingoofs scene of the early 1980s.

History
Originally formed by singer Mopa Dean, the bassist for Masochistic Religion, and drummer Kyle Peek, the earliest lineup also included Lamo, Philphee Saunders and Bunchofuckingoofs Thor Hammersen.

They played their first show June 7, 1989. By the end of 1990, they had recorded enough live performances that they were able to independently release a 17-track collection called Promoting Peace To Violence 89-90. Eight of those songs appeared on their 1991 12-track demo tape, Fully Loaded. By this time, Lamo, Saunders and Hammersen had been replaced by guitarist Hardcore Dave and bassist Kieran Plunkett.

In 1992, guitarists Big John and Dorian Wilde replaced Hardcore Dave. This line-up was featured on the next several releases: split EPs with Suckerpunch and Oppressed Logic, the song "Rat Poison" which was included in the Raw Energy Records punk compilation Dead on the Road - Songs Without Keyboards, and the song "Beans and Toast" which was included in the 1996 Ransom Note Recordings Compilation Living in Fear.

In 1995, Armed and Hammered claimed that they were banned from a repeat performance on Much Music. The band had played the Kumbaya Festival, which was held at the Molson Amphitheatre (now The Budweiser Stage) to benefit people living with AIDS. It was broadcast live across Canada and rebroadcast the following day; Much Music removed the band's performance from the rebroadcast and replaced it with an REM video.

The band's line-up would change again. Guitarist Dorian Wilde left in 1994 and was replaced by Kurf. Kieran Plunkett moved to the UK where he toured with The Varukers and formed The Restarts. He was replaced by Rick Giroux, who was replaced in 1997 by former Heatseekers and Suckerpunch bassist, Cindy Beattie. The band's debut full-length album, It's About Fucking Time, was recorded over 1996 and 1997 and features both Rick and Cindy. The CD also features re-recordings of many songs from earlier releases. It also spent some time in the independent charts in Canada. Also in 1996, the European label Subvert & Deny released the four-track EP More Punk Rock Than You.

In 1998, Kurf left the band and was replaced by former Abalienation guitarist, Mark Dickinson. In 2000, following the release of the Negative Aspects of Positive Thinking CD, Mark returned to the US, leaving Armed and Hammered once again with one guitarist. In 2000, Mopa left the group to be replaced by Jaww singer Doug McLarty. After Mopa's departure, the group became mostly inactive, playing only a handful of gigs before their final shows in early 2003. Mopa formed a band called The G-Men in 2002; they played at least one gig with Armed & Hammered, on November 15, 2002, at Sneaky Dee's in Toronto. These final shows featured the return of former members Kurf and Rick.

Armed and Hammered reunited to play a set in support of English group GBH's tour stop at the Mod Club Theatre in Toronto in July 2010, then reformed in May 2012. The band is still performing and recording. In February 2021, they released a four-track split with Vulgar Deli.

Discography 
 Promoting Peace Through Violence 89-90 (1990), Cassette, Independent
 Fully Loaded (1991), Cassette, Independent 
 Armed & Hammered/Suckerpunch (1993), 7inch EP,, Independent
 Armed & Hammered/Oppressed Logic (1995), 7inch EP, Split with Oppressed Logic, Ransom Note Recordings
 Don't Mess with Punk (1996), Cassette, Independent
 More Punk Rock Than You (1996), 7inch EP, Subvert & Deny Records
 It's About Fucking Time (1997), CD Obese Records
 Negative Aspects of Positive Thinking, (2000), CD Independent
 Armed & Hammered/Vulgar Deli - American Democracy / Kill Johnny Stiff, (2021), 7inch EP,  Coke Dick Records

Various Artists Compilations
 Dead On the Road - Songs Without Keyboards (1994), CD, Compilation Inclusion, Raw Energy Records
 Living in Fear (1995), CD, Compilation Inclusion, Ransom Note Recordings
 Disease Control: Vol. 1 (1999), CD, MUCK Records
 Twentybandcomp - Various Artists Vol., (2000), CD Raw Energy Records – Shock Records
 Ontario Punk Rock Compilation - Various Artists Vol. 4 (2020), Compilation Inclusion, CD., Lockdown Records Canada
  Punk Canada Vol. 2 (2023), Compilation Inclusion, LP., En Guard Records Canada

Members 

2012 Lineup
 Kyle Peek – drums
 Mopa Dean – vocals
 Big John (John Mckee) – guitar
 Jamie "G" – guitar
 Preston "Wounded Paw" Sims

Past
 Thor (BFG) Hammersen – bass, former member of  Bunchofuckingoofs, Perdition, Ride at Dawn and Blast Furnace
 Steve "Lamo" – guitar
 Phil "Philphee" Saunders – bass
 Kieran Plunkett – bass, member of The Varukers, The Restarts
 Kurf – guitar, former member of PolitiKILL inCOREct, Yeti
 Doug McLarty – vocals, former member of Jaww
 Rick Giroux – bass, member of The G-Men and Son of Bronto, former member of Sinking Ships
 Cindy Beattie – bass, former member of Suckerpunch, The Heatseekers, Sharkskin
 Dorian Wilde – guitar, former member of Suckerpunch
 Mark Dickinson – guitar, member of Others, Bloodsucking Freaks, former member of Abalienation
 Hardcore Dave (David Mcleod) – guitar, former member of Bunchofuckingoofs, Nunoyerfuckinbizznizz, No ID and Landfill
 Allyson Baker – guitar, member of Dirty Ghosts, former member of Teen Crud Combo, Shuttlecocks
 John Grove – bass, member of Bunchofuckingoofs

References 

Canadian hardcore punk groups
Musical groups from Toronto
Musical groups established in 1989
Musical groups disestablished in 2010
1989 establishments in Ontario
2010 disestablishments in Ontario